Appleton Technical Academy, more commonly known as ATECH, is a public charter school with a focus on developing the skills necessary for successful entry into the modern advanced manufacturing workforce. The school was created as a result of the growing number of manufacturing jobs that need to be filled in  Wisconsin, as baby boomers retire. In the first three years of operation the school reported giving out over 250 college credits, worth over $37,000.

The school gives students the ability to earn up to 24 college credits at the nearby Fox Valley Technical College which can be transferred to a 4-year college if the student chooses to do so. This results in the student saving hundreds of dollars on student tuition as well as completing the first 8 months of most programs while still being in high school.

ATECH is a part-time school for ninth and tenth graders and a full-time school for 11th and 12th graders. 11th and 12th graders pick a focus area depending on their interests, including welding, machining, automated manufacturing, and mechanical design.

History 
The idea of the school came when Jared Bailin, the president of Eagle Plastics came to Greg Hartjes with the concern that there was a need for people to fill jobs, but also develop the skills needed to successfully work in the shop environment daily; a planning board was formed shortly after. The board was given a grant shortly after its formation to plan the school by the WDPI.

Shop renovation 
In the summer of 2014, a referendum was passed by the Appleton Area School District, providing funding to renovate many of their buildings with much of this being contributed to remodeling the shops at Appleton West High School. As part of the renovations, the whole Tech-Ed wing was gutted completely and rebuilt. New equipment was purchased that resembles the equipment widely found out in the workforce.

Typical schedule 
The typical day at ATech consists of nine periods, the amount of time spent in the charter depends on grade level.

Awards 

On October 21, 2015, the school was presented the "Brighter Image" Award by the NEW Manufacturing Alliance. The Brighter Image is presented for excellence in manufacturing/K12 partnerships.

See also 
 Appleton West High School
 Fox Valley Technical College
 Appleton Area School District

References

External links
 Appleton Technical Acadedmy

High schools in Appleton, Wisconsin
Educational institutions established in 2013
2013 establishments in Wisconsin
Public high schools in Wisconsin